This is a list of members of the Victorian Legislative Assembly, from the elections of 25 March; 9, 22 April 1874 to the elections of 11 May 1877. Victoria was a British self-governing colony in Australia at the time.

Note the "Term in Office" refers to that member's term(s) in the Assembly, not necessarily for that electorate.

Charles MacMahon was Speaker, Benjamin Davies was Chairman of Committees.

 Carrol forfeited his seat in May 1875, replaced by David Gaunson May 1875.
 Everard resigned in July 1874, replaced by George Langridge in August 1874.
 Francis resigned in November 1874, replaced by Joseph Bosisto in December 1874.
 Higinbotham resigned in January 1876, replaced by William Mitchell Cook in February 1876.
 Jones left Parliament in October 1875, replaced by George Fincham  in November 1875.
 Madden left Parliament in October 1875, replaced by Mark Last King in November 1875.
 O'Grady died 5 January 1876, replaced by Joseph Jones in February 1876.
 Pope died 8 July 1874, replaced by Richard Henry Lock in August 1874.
 Richardson died 12 March 1876, replaced by Charles Kernot in April 1876.
 Smyth resigned c. March 1875, replaced by James McKean from May 1875 until being expelled in July 1876; replaced by Charles Gavan Duffy from August 1876.
 Sullivan died 3 February 1876, replaced by James Mirams in a February 1876 by-election.
 Thomas died 10 July 1876, replaced by John Madden in an August 1876 by-election.

 = district abolished in 1877

References

Members of the Parliament of Victoria by term
19th-century Australian politicians